Monan is a village and union council of Jhelum District in the Punjab Province of Pakistan.

References

Populated places in Tehsil Jhelum
Union councils of Jhelum Tehsil